During the 1969–70 season, Red Star Belgrade participated in the 1969–70 Yugoslav First League, 1969–70 Yugoslav Cup, 1969 Yugoslav Super Cup and 1969–70 European Cup.

Season summary
Red Star won the inaugural Yugoslav Super Cup and their fourth double in this season.

On 10 September 1969, Red Star played a friendly match against Santos.

Squad

Results

Yugoslav First League

Yugoslav Cup

Yugoslav Super Cup

European Cup

First round

Second round

See also
 List of Red Star Belgrade seasons

References

Red Star Belgrade seasons
Red Star
Red Star
Yugoslav football championship-winning seasons